Peter Florin  (2 October 1921 – 17 February 2014) was an East German politician and diplomat.

Early life
Florin was born in Cologne on 2 October 1921.

His father, Wilhelm Florin (1894 - 1944), was a leading figure in the pre-war Communist Party of Germany. and, between 1924 and 1933, a member of the Reichstag (national parliament).

Florin left Germany with his parents in 1933, when Adolf Hitler came to power and began persecuting Communists, moving first to France and then to the Soviet Union, where he attended the Karl Liebknecht School. There, he studied chemistry at the D. Mendeleev University of Chemical Technology.

During the Second World War, he fought with the Soviet partisans in Belarus. In 1944, Florin became editor of Freies Deutschland, a weekly anti-Nazi newspaper. At the end of the war, he returned to Germany as a member of the Ackermann Group, one of the regional groups sent to lay the groundwork for the Soviet Military Administration in Germany.

Career
Following the war, Florin entered politics in the German Democratic Republic and served as vice-president of the regional parliament of Wittenberg, while working as chief editor of the daily newspaper Freiheit. Then, from 1949 to 1952, he was an advisor for the East German ministry of foreign affairs. In 1953, he was promoted to the head of the department of foreign affairs of the Socialist Unity Party of Germany's central committee. From 1954 to 1971, he was a member of the country's parliamentary committee on foreign affairs, which he presided over for a time.

From 1967 to 1969, Florin was East Germany's ambassador to Czechoslovakia. He supported the Soviet crushing of the Prague Spring uprising in 1968. In 1969, he was named secretary of state and first deputy foreign minister.

From 1973 to 1982, Florin was the German Democratic Republic's permanent representative to the United Nations. In 1982, he became president of the national commission for UNESCO in East Germany. In 1987 and 1988, he presided over the forty-second session of the United Nations General Assembly.

Personal life
Peter Florin was married, and had three children. His wife Edel was, in the late 1980s, a professor of Russian literature at Humboldt University in East Berlin.

Florin spoke fluent German, Russian and English, and good French. During his presidency of the United Nations General Assembly, he was, according to the New York Times, "nicknamed 'Comrade Glasnost' by delegates, who s[aw] him as him a symbol of the modern Communist of the Gorbachev era."

He died aged 92 in 2014.

References

External links
 "Forty-second General Assembly opens in hopeful atmosphere of increasing multilateral co-operation", UN Chronicle, November 1987

1921 births
2014 deaths
Politicians from Cologne
People from the Rhine Province
Members of the Central Committee of the Socialist Unity Party of Germany
Government ministers of East Germany
Members of the State Council of East Germany
Members of the 1st Volkskammer
Members of the 2nd Volkskammer
Members of the 3rd Volkskammer
Members of the 4th Volkskammer
Members of the 5th Volkskammer
Members of the 6th Volkskammer
Members of the 7th Volkskammer
Members of the 8th Volkskammer
Members of the 9th Volkskammer
Ambassadors of East Germany to Czechoslovakia
Permanent Representatives of East Germany to the United Nations
Presidents of the United Nations General Assembly
Refugees from Nazi Germany in the Soviet Union
Soviet military personnel of World War II
Soviet partisans
Belarusian partisans
National Committee for a Free Germany members
Recipients of the Patriotic Order of Merit (honor clasp)
Recipients of the Banner of Labor
Recipients of the Order of the Red Banner
Janitors
German newspaper editors
German expatriates in France
German expatriates in the Soviet Union